Kulchytsi (historic name — Кульчачке, Кольчиці) is a village (selo), which is located in Sambir Raion, Lviv Oblast, of Western Ukraine. It belongs to Ralivka rural hromada, one of the hromadas of Ukraine.

The  estimated population is around 1,639. Local government is administered by Kulchytska village council.

Geography 
The village is situated on the hilly area at a distance  from the district center Sambir.

History 
Archaeological excavations have revealed traces of settlements from the 5th to 4th centuries BC, although the official founding date of village is 1284. Thirteen Stone-Age burial mounds (late 3rd millennium BC) near Kulchytsi were investigated. The settlement beginning Iron Age (about the 7th or 6th century BC) have been preserved in territory of village

A historic name of the village was Kulchachke (Кульчачке; Ukrainian) of Tatar origin.

Religious structures and attractions 
Christians have an opportunity to visit the Exaltation of the Holy Cross Orthodox Church, Church of the Transfiguration and Church of Saints Florus and Laurus.

In the village has an architectural monument of local importance of Sambir Raion (Sambir district). It is a wooden bell tower of Church of Florus and Laurus 18th century (499-М).

Museums and monuments 
Village residents know and want to learn of the history of the village and land. Valuable historical and architectural attractions been saved in the village. This is museum by name Hetman Sahaidachny, a monument to Hetman Petro Sahaidachny, Yuri-Franz Kulchytsky monument, a wooden Bell tower of Church of Florus and Laurus 18th century and other.

The idea of the museum foundation appeared in 1992, when the monument to Petro Konashevych-Sahaydachny was opened. It was decided to found the museum in the native village of the Ukrainian Hetman who had played the most important part in the history of Ukrainian Cossacks. Museum Director Bogdan Sydor is one of the founders of the museum.

Famous people 
 Petro Konashevych-Sahaidachny (1570-1622) — Otaman Cossack Army, Getman his the Royal grace Zaporizhia Army. He was an outstanding figure in Ukraine's history, a major political leader and statesman, the leader of the Cossack Regiment and one of the founders of the Kyiv Brotherhood. He played an important role in the life of the Ukrainian Orthodox Church and the university, Kyiv-Mohyla Academy.
 Marko Zhmaylo-Kulchytskyy — Registered Cossacks Hetman (1625), leader of the peasant-Cossack Zhmaylo Uprising in 1625.
 Jerzy Franciszek Kulczycki (1640-1694) — Polish political and civic leader, coffee businessman

References

External links 
 Село Кульчиці 
 "КУЛЬЧИЦІ - Гетьманське село над Дністром" » Історія села Кульчиці 
 Kulchytsi – Wikimapia
 Кульчиці, Свв. Флора і Лавра 1904 
   Cossack Web Museum, Hetman Sahaidachny
  KARPATY.INFO/Traveling in the Carpathians and around/Western Ukraine/Lviv region/Sambir district/Kulchytsi: 
 KARPATY.INFO/Museum of HETMAN SAHAYDACHNY

Literature 
  History of Towns and Villages of the Ukrainian SSR, Lvov region. – Київ : ГРУРЕ, 1968 р., Page 834.
  Богдан Сидор, Подільці і подільчани - Самбір, 2008.

Villages in Sambir Raion